Switzerland Innovation (German: Schweizerischer Innovationspark, French: Parc suisse d'innovation), organised through the Switzerland Innovation Foundation is the Swiss national network of science parks.

It was inaugurated by Johann Schneider-Ammann on 18 January 2016 and will be organised around five locations:
 Swiss Innovation Park Basel Area (in Allschwil);
 Swiss Innovation Park innovaare (near the Paul Scherrer Institute in Villigen);
 Swiss Innovation Park Zurich (on areas of the Dübendorf Air Base);
 Swiss Innovation Park Biel/Bienne;
 Switzerland Innovation Park Network West EPFL ("Romandy hub"):
 Innovation park of the École Polytechnique Fédérale de Lausanne
 Biopôle in Épalinges;
 Microcity in Neuchâtel;
 Energypolis in Sion;
 Bluefactory in Fribourg;
 Campus Biotech in Geneva.

Company involvement 
Various companies and organisations are based at Switzerland Innovation Park locations, ranging from startups to multinational organisations.

Switzerland Innovation Park Network West EPFL 

Over 200 companies are listed as resident at the EPFL campuses in Lausanne and Geneva (Campus Biotech). These include:

 Akselos – simulation software
 Camptocamp SA – open source software solutions startup.
 Cisco Systems – global communications and information technology product and service provider.
 DistalMotion SA – startup developing devices for minimally-invasive surgery.
 Gamaya – hyperspectral cameras for precision agriculture
 High Lantern Group – consulting firm dealing in strategic positioning.
 Intel – multinational semiconductor chip manufacturer.
 Iprova Sàrl – a Swiss startup specialising in Computer-Accelerated Invention.
 Logitech – a Swiss manufacturer of computer peripherals and software.
 Nestlé Institute of Health Sciences – part of Nestlé's research and development section, specialising in biomedical research.
 Scantrust – software for  product authentication and traceability.
 Signals Analytics – data analytics company with its own proprietary software, Signals Playbook.
 Sophia Genetics SA – Swiss medical bioinformatics startup.
 Texas Instruments ITC – semiconductor and integrated circuit manufacturer.

Swiss Innovation Park Zürich 
The Zürich location of the Swiss Innovation Park has had slow progress getting the necessary political green lights. Nonetheless, various ETH Competition Teams have already found their new Headquarters in the new Dübendorf location. These include:

 AMZ - The university's Academic Motorsport Association.
 ARIS - The university's Academic Spaceflight Initiative.
 Swissloop - The university's Hyperloop team.
 E-Sling - A group focusing on the electrification of a 4 seater.

After its completion the Innovation Park in Zürich expects to house more commercial companies such as:

 Matternet
 VRM Switzerland
 New Green Tec
 V-Locker
 AEROPLAN
 Habasit
 VILT
 Swiss Sino Innovation Center

See also 
 State Secretariat for Education, Research and Innovation

References

External links 
 Official website
 EPFL Innovation Park

Science parks in Switzerland
2015 establishments in Switzerland